Claude-Guy Hallé (17 January 1652, Paris – 5 November 1736, Paris) was a French painter. He was the son of the painter Daniel Hallé.

Claude Guy Hallé won the prix de Rome in 1675 for The Transgression of Adam and Eve. He was crowned many times by the Académie royale de peinture. He was entrusted with many large works at the royal residences of Meudon and Trianon. His son was the painter Noël Hallé and his daughter, Marie-Anne Hallé (b 1704), married the painter Jean II Restout.

Works
 The Transgression of Adam and Eve, 1675
 Jeux d'enfants : le saut du chien, French embassy in Germany
 Presentation in the Temple, Rouen; Musée des beaux-arts
 Adoration of the Mahgi, Musée d’Orléans
 The Annunciation, Musée du Louvre
 Reparation by the doge of Genoa to Louis XIV, 15 May 1685, Musée de Marseille
 Simon Hurtrelle (1648-1724), Musée de Versailles

References

External links 
 Claude Guy Hallé on base joconde

1652 births
1736 deaths
Painters from Paris
French Baroque painters